Padre Tião is a Brazilian telenovela produced and broadcast by TV Globo. It premiered on 12 December 1965 and ended on 17 February 1966, with a total of 50 episodes. It was the third "novela das sete" to be aired on the timeslot. It was created by Moysés Weltman and directed by Otávio Graça Mello.

Cast

References 

TV Globo telenovelas
1965 Brazilian television series debuts
1966 Brazilian television series endings
1965 telenovelas
Brazilian telenovelas
Portuguese-language telenovelas